Sphaerodactylus scaber, also known as the double-collared sphaero or Camaguey least gecko, is a small species of gecko endemic to Cuba.

References

Sphaerodactylus
Endemic fauna of Cuba
Reptiles of Cuba
Reptiles described in 1919
Taxa named by Thomas Barbour